Magnus Landin Jacobsen (born 20 August 1995) is a Danish handballer for THW Kiel and the Danish national team.

He is the younger brother of Niklas Landin Jacobsen.

Playing career
Landin won the 2013 Men's Youth World Handball Championship along the Danish youth national team, defeating Croatia 32–26 in OT.

In 2013 Jacobsen signed with Nordsjælland Håndbold transferring from HIK.

In 2014 it was announced that the talented left wing had signed a two-year contract with KIF Kolding København starting at the begin of the 2014/2015 season. He won his first Danish championship the first year at KIF Kolding Copenhagen.

On 17 November 2017, KIF Kolding København announced that Magnus would leave the club at the end of the 2017/2018 season. Later same day, it was announced that he would join THW Kiel on a two-year contract starting at the begin of the 2018/2019 season.

Landin made his debut for the Danish national team on 10 June 2015 in a match against Lithuania.

Honours
EHF Champions League:
: 2020
EHF Cup:
:  2019
German Championship
: 2020, 2021
DHB-Pokal
: 2019, 2022
German Super Cup
: 2020
Danish Championship:
: 2015

References

External links

1995 births
People from Gladsaxe Municipality
Living people
Danish male handball players
KIF Kolding players
THW Kiel players
Expatriate handball players
Danish expatriate sportspeople in Germany
Handball-Bundesliga players
Handball players at the 2020 Summer Olympics
Medalists at the 2020 Summer Olympics
Olympic silver medalists for Denmark
Olympic medalists in handball
Sportspeople from the Capital Region of Denmark